Fabian Kruuse Cowdrey (born 30 January 1993) is an English former professional cricketer who played for Kent County Cricket Club. He made history by becoming the first third generation player to play for the county, following his father, Chris Cowdrey, and grandfather Colin Cowdrey. Cowdrey was often employed as an all-rounder, batting right-handed and bowling slow left arm orthodox deliveries.

Cricket career
Cowdrey was awarded a first-team contract in October 2011 before making his First XI debut for Kent in May 2012 against Oxford MCCU. He made his first-class cricket debut playing for Cardiff MCC University against Glamorgan in April 2013 before making his competitive debut for Kent later the same summer in the 2013 Friends Life t20. He appeared for the county in the 2013 Yorkshire Bank 40 later in the season before making his first-class debut for Kent in June 2014.

After playing Grade cricket for Sunshine Coast Scorchers in Queensland over the 2013–14 English off-season, Cowdrey captained Western Suburbs in Sydney Grade Cricket during the 2015–16 season.

Cowdrey's 2016 season was cut short in July when he had an emergency appendectomy. On the eve of the 2017 season he left Kent by mutual consent with Cowdrey later saying that his "love for the game is gone, my heart's not in it". In April 2017 Cowdrey made his first appearance on BBC Radio Kent as a cricket commentator, covering Kent's match against Derbyshire at Canterbury and later in the year began writing for The Cricketer.

Family
Cowdrey's father is former Kent and England captain Chris Cowdrey. His grandfather, Colin, Lord Cowdrey also captained both sides and played 114 Test matches for England, the first man to make 100 Test appearances. He was honoured for his services to cricket, the first English cricketer to be ennobled in this way. His uncle, Graham Cowdrey, also played for Kent and his great-grandfather, Ernest Cowdrey made one first-class cricket appearance in the 1920s.

Cowdrey has a twin brother, Julius, who is a professional musician and reality TV character, joining Made in Chelsea in 2016. Both brothers attended Tonbridge School, as did their father, uncle and grandfather, Fabian exceeding his grandfather's total of runs scored for the school and beating his record of most runs scored in a year. Cowdrey wrote the lyrics for his brother's debut single during 2016 and, following his release from Kent, aimed to support his brother and to continue as a lyricist.

References

External links

Living people
1993 births
English cricketers
Cardiff MCCU cricketers
Kent cricketers
Sportspeople from Canterbury
People educated at Tonbridge School